Swinney Switch, also known as Swinney, is an unincorporated community in southeastern Live Oak County, Texas, United States.

The community is named for Sidney J. Swinney, who moved to Live Oak County from Gonzales and opened a store and gas station in the area in 1917. Swinney added the word "Switch" to the name of his settlement in the hopes that a railroad would build through it.

References

Unincorporated communities in Live Oak County, Texas
Unincorporated communities in Texas